Derry (also known as Londonderry) is a city in Northern Ireland.

Derry may also refer to:

Places

Connected to the city
 County Londonderry, also called County Derry
 Roman Catholic Diocese of Derry

Elsewhere in Ireland
 Derry, County Armagh, a townland in County Armagh
 Three townlands in County Cavan:
 Derry, Crosserlough
 Derry, Killashandra
 Derry, Shercock
 Three townlands in County Clare:
 Derry, Inagh
 Derry, Kilseily
 Derry, Templemaley
 Four townlands in County Cork:
 Derry, Clonmeen
 Derry, Desertserges
 Derry, Donaghmore
 Derry, Ross
 Two townlands in County Down:
 Derry, Ballyphilip
 Derry, Dromara
 Derry, County Fermanagh, a townland in County Fermanagh
 Three townlands in County Galway:
 Derry, Ballynacourty
 Derry, Beagh
 Derry, Meelick
 Derry, County Kerry, a townland in County Kerry
 Derry, County Limerick, a townland in County Limerick
 Three townlands in County Laois:
 Derry, Kilmanman
 Derry, Rearymore
 Derry, Straboe
 Five townlands in County Mayo:
 Derry, Ballinchalla
 Derry, Cong
 Derry, Crossboyne
 Derry, Kilgeever
 Derry, Knock
 Three townlands in County Monaghan:
 Derry, Aghnamullen
 Derry, Magheracloone
 Derry, Tehallan
 Derry, County Roscommon, a townland in County Roscommon
 Derry, County Sligo, a townland in County Sligo
 Two townlands in County Tipperary:
 Derry, Dorrha
 Derry, Loughmoe East
 Two townlands in County Tyrone:
 Derry, Kilskeery
 Derry, Tullyniskan
 Derry, County Westmeath, a townland in County Westmeath
 Derry, County Wexford, a townland in County Wexford
 River Derry, County Wicklow

In Britain
 Derry Downs, a district of Orpington, Kent

In the United States
 Derry, Louisiana, an unincorporated community
 Derry, Maine, a fictional town, setting of some of Stephen King's fiction
 Derry, New Hampshire, a New England town
 Derry (CDP), New Hampshire, the densely settled central part of the town
 Derry, New Mexico, an unincorporated community
 Derry, Oregon
 Derry, Pennsylvania, a borough
 Derry Mining Site Camp, near Leadville, Colorado, that lasted from 1916 to 1923
 Derry Township (disambiguation), numerous places

People
 Derry (given name), a list of people
 Derry (surname), a list of people

Other uses
 Derry City F.C., professional association football club
 Derry GAA, Gaelic football and hurling teams representing the county
 Derry Girls, an award-winning Channel 4 sitcom broadcast from 2018-2022
 USS Derry (ID-1391), United States Navy barge in service from 1917 to 1919
 Derry (Stephen King), a fictional town in Maine

See also
 Londonderry (disambiguation)
 Derry City (disambiguation)
 Dery